Cherebayevo is a rural locality (a selo) in Staropoltavsky District, Volgograd Oblast, Russia. The population was 585 as of 2010. There are 13 streets.

Geography 
Cherebayevo is located in steppe, on Transvolga, near the Volgograd Reservoir, 74 km northwest of Staraya Poltavka (the district's administrative centre) by road. Limanny is the nearest rural locality.

References 

Rural localities in Staropoltavsky District